Chittur  is a village in Palakkad district in the state of Kerala, India. A part of it is governed by the Nalleppilly gram panchayat, along with the villages of Nalleppilly and Thekkedesom.

Demographics
 India census, Chittur had a population of 5,244 with 2,540 males and 2,704 females.

References

Villages in Palakkad district